The Bridge of Sighs is a 1936 American crime film directed by Phil Rosen and starring Onslow Stevens, Dorothy Tree and Jack La Rue.

Cast
 Onslow Stevens as Jeffrey 'Jeff' Powell  
 Dorothy Tree as Marion Courtney, aka Mary Court  
 Jack La Rue as Packy Lacy  
 Mary Doran as Evelyn 'Duchess' Thane  
 Walter Byron as Arny Norman  
 Oscar Apfel as Judge 'Teddy' Blaisdell  
 Maidel Turner as Mrs. Blaisdell  
 John Kelly as Tommy, the Taxi Driver-Thug  
 Paul Fix as Harrison Courtney, Jr. aka Harry West  
 Robert Homans as Homicide Capt. P.G. Otheron  
 Selmer Jackson as Defense Attorney Alan Adams  
 Bryant Washburn as Neselli  
 Kathryn Sheldon as Mabel the Maid

References

Bibliography
 Norman O. Keim. Our Movie Houses: A History of Film & Cinematic Innovation in Central New York. Syracuse University Press, 2008.

External links
 

1936 films
1936 crime drama films
American crime drama films
Films directed by Phil Rosen
Chesterfield Pictures films
American black-and-white films
American crime thriller films
1930s crime thriller films
1930s English-language films
1930s American films